Mactra stultorum, previously sometimes known as Mactra corallina, is a species of edible saltwater clam, a marine bivalve mollusc in the family Mactridae, the trough shells.

Distribution
This species lives in the Black Sea, the Mediterranean coasts, and the west coast of Europe, from Norway to the Iberian Peninsula, and south to Senegal.

Habitat

This bivalve lives on sandy (rarely soft) bottoms at depths of between 5 and 30 m, although the shell is very often found on beaches, where it has been cast up by wave action.

Shell description

This species has a very thin and delicate shell, which has concentric growth lines and sometimes also has colored radiating bands, hence its common name, the rayed trough shell. The shell interior is white.

Human use
This species is sometimes sold in markets as a food item.

References 

Mactridae
Molluscs described in 1758
Taxa named by Carl Linnaeus